GR-159897 is a potent and selective NK2 receptor antagonist drug. It has anxiolytic effects in animal models, and also inhibits bronchoconstriction of the airways, which may potentially make it useful in the treatment of asthma.

See also 
 Ibodutant
 Nepadutant
 Saredutant

References 

Anxiolytics
NK2 receptor antagonists
Tryptamines
Fluoroarenes
Piperidines
Ethers
Sulfoxides